Heraclio Fernández Noya (1851–1886), was a Venezuelan musician, best known for the composition El Diablo Suelto.

Heraclio Fernández Noya was born in Maracaibo in 1851, but since he was a child he lived in La Guaira, together with his father Manuel María Fernández, from whom he received his first piano lessons. Both in his hometown, and in La Guaira, he taught piano lessons. In Caracas, he founded the newspaper El Zancudo, a weekly whose first issue was published on January 9, 1876. On October 10, 1884, the bi-weekly magazine El Museo appeared on the street. composer of the moment; as well as satirical-humorous musical literary works, which Fernández signed with the pseudonym "El Zancudo".

In the magazine El Museo, on San José's day in 1888, "El diablo suelto" was released, a joropeado waltz composed by Heraclio Fernández, whose score was located and published by "the world's first guitarist", Alirio Díaz and later by José Peñín, editor and director of the Spanish and Hispano-American Music Dictionary and the Encyclopedia of Music in Venezuela. About Heraclio Fernandez and his ability as a pianist was read in the newspaper El Zancudo: "He played the piano with exquisite feeling and composed pieces of living room that lovers of good music kept as a model of rhythms and forms."

The only copy of his work "New method to learn to accompany the piano" rests in the National Library, and in it and other printed materials of his authorship gives advice and opinions of interpretation and character on how the piano was played at the end of the nineteenth century. Pieces such as "Misa a dos voces", the waltzes "Echoes of the heart", "The variations on the araguato", "Happy New Year", "To General Francisco Alcántara" and the dances "La juguetona", "Violetas sensivas", "Do not forget me" and "Recuerdos del teatro Naar" are part of the richest Venezuelan music collection, which nowadays travels the world, in particular, in the notes of "El diablo suelto" by Heraclio Fernández.

References
Sabor Gaitero (Spanish)

1851 births
1886 deaths
19th-century composers
Male composers
People from Maracaibo
Venezuelan composers
Venezuelan folk musicians
19th-century male musicians